Mário Marques (23 September 1901 – 1989) was a Portuguese breaststroke swimmer. He competed in the men's 200 metre breaststroke event at the 1924 Summer Olympics.

References

External links
 

1901 births
1989 deaths
Portuguese male breaststroke swimmers
Olympic swimmers of Portugal
Swimmers at the 1924 Summer Olympics
Place of birth missing